Ya'acov Yakir Lusky (born 18 March 1986), commonly referred to as Yakir Lusky, is an Israeli footballer.  He currently is on trial with the Seattle Sounders FC of the Major League Soccer.

Biography

Playing career 
Lusky made his league debut in a Premier League match against Maccabi Netanya on 19 October 2003. In January 2010, he was on trial with the Seattle Sounders FC of the Major League Soccer.

Statistics

References

External links
 

1986 births
Living people
Israeli footballers
Association football midfielders
Hapoel Tel Aviv F.C. players
Hapoel Petah Tikva F.C. players
Hakoah Maccabi Amidar Ramat Gan F.C. players
Hapoel Ashkelon F.C. players